The Palazzo Pallavicini is a sprawling 15th-century palace located on Via San Felice #24 in Bologna, region of Emilia Romagna, Italy. It extends to Via del Pratello and Via de'Coltellini. There is another Palazzo Pallavicini in Bologna located on Via San Stefano.

History
The palace has belonged to many families including the Vila, Volta, Marsili, and 
Alamandini. The left (east) part of the facade was reconstructed in 1788 based on designs of Alessandro Amadesi. The baroque staircase was designed circa 1690 by Luigi Casoli. The interior has a grand salon frescoed in 1690 by Giovanni Antonio Burrini. It also has some late 18th century decorations commissioned between 1789 and 1792 by Giuseppe Pallavicini, and completed by the Flaminio Minozzi, Francesco Pedrini, Vincenzo Martinelli, Giovanni Antonio Valliani, S. Barozzi, with stuccoes by Giuseppe Rossi.

On March 26, 1770, in the palace's Sala della Musica, a young Amadeus Mozart performed here.

References

Pallavacini San Felice